Crowton is a civil parish and village within the unitary authority of Cheshire West and Chester and the ceremonial county of Cheshire, England.  It is located approximately 6 miles west of Northwich. The civil parish includes the small settlement of Ruloe. The population of the civil parish as taken at the 2011 census was 465.

See also

Listed buildings in Crowton
Christ Church, Crowton

References

External links

Villages in Cheshire
Civil parishes in Cheshire